Marco Born (born ), the former director of athletics for Lamar University, was named to the position on March 29, 2018. He previously served in several positions of increasing responsibility at the Louisiana Tech University and Middle Tennessee State University athletic departments. He graduated with his bachelor's and master's degrees from Middle Tennessee State University where he lettered in tennis.  Born resigned his position on March 10, 2022 after a leave of absence for personal reasons beginning on January 13, 2022.

Athletic history

Born and teammate, Andreas Siljeström, won the 2007 NCAA Division I Tennis doubles championship.  He and Siljeström also won the 2005 All-American Doubles National Championship.  The two were two-time ITA all-Americans (2006, 2007).  The two were named to the Middle Tennessee State Athletic Hall of Fame (Class of 2017) on September 23, 2017.

References

External links
 Lamar profile

Living people
Middle Tennessee Blue Raiders men's tennis players
Lamar Cardinals and Lady Cardinals athletic directors
1983 births
German male tennis players
German tennis coaches
Sportspeople from Hanover